Karl Mezulian (born 1899, date of death unknown) was an Austrian wrestler. He competed in the Greco-Roman featherweight event at the 1924 Summer Olympics.

References

External links
 

1899 births
Year of death missing
Olympic wrestlers of Austria
Wrestlers at the 1924 Summer Olympics
Austrian male sport wrestlers
Place of birth missing